The Alexandria Rovers are an Australian rugby league football team based in Alexandria, New South Wales, a suburb of south-central Sydney. They play in the South Sydney District Junior Rugby Football League.

Notable Juniors
Notable First Grade Players that have played in the Alexandria Rovers include:
Russell Fairfax
Manoa Thompson
Craig Field
Yileen Gordon
Greg Hawick
Trent Merrin
Nathan Merritt
Adam Reynolds
Steve Mavin
Reece Robinson
Travis Robinson
Darrell Trindall
Paul Momirovski

See also

List of rugby league clubs in Australia

References

External links
 

Rugby league teams in Sydney
Rugby clubs established in 1948
1948 establishments in Australia
Alexandria, New South Wales